Sycamore, West Virginia may refer to:

Sycamore, Calhoun County, West Virginia, an unincorporated community
Sycamore, Logan County, West Virginia, an unincorporated community